

Saint Donnán of Eigg (also known as Donan; died  17 April 617) was a Gaelic priest, likely from Ireland, who attempted to introduce Christianity to the Picts of northwestern Scotland during the Early Middle Ages. Donnán is the patron saint of Eigg, an island in the Inner Hebrides where he was martyred.

The Martyrology of Donegal, compiled by Michael O'Clery in the 17th century, records the manner of his death:

Another tradition states that a pagan Pictish queen had him and 150 others burnt. He is thought to be buried at Kildonan, on the Isle of Arran. Saint Donnán's feast day is 17 April.

The Latin account in the book of Leinster says: 'Eigg is the name of a spring in Aldasain. And there Donnán and his community suffered martyrdom. This is how it came about. A rich woman used to dwell there before the coming of Donnán and her flocks grazed there. On account of the ill-feeling she had towards Donnán and his community, she persuaded a number of bandits to kill him. When these bandits arrived in Eigg, they found them chanting their psalms in the oratory and they could not kill them there. Donnán however said to his community: 'Let us go into the refectory so that these men may be able to kill us there where we do our living according to the demands of the body; since as long as we remain where we have done our all to please God, we cannot die, but where we have served the body, we may pay the price of the body.' In this way, therefore, they were killed in their refectory on the eve of Easter. Fifty-four others died together alongside Donnán'.

Places bearing his name
Eilean Donnáin, Loch Alsh
Kildonan, Isle of Arran
Kildonnan, Eigg (site of his monastery - excavated in 2012)
Kildonan, Sutherland
Kildonan Drive, Thornwood, Glasgow
Kildonnan, Kilpheder Parish, South Uist
Kildonnan, Little Loch Broom, Wester Ross
Kildonnen, Lynedate, Loch Snizort, Skye
Seipeil Dhonnáin, Kishorn
St. Donnan's Chapel, Little Bernera, Lewis
Saint-Donan, Brittany, France
East Kildonan, Winnipeg, Manitoba, Canada
West Kildonan, Winnipeg, Manitoba, Canada
Kildonan, British Columbia, Canada
At least eleven Scottish churches are named for Saint Donnán.

See also
Celtic Christianity
Columba
Hiberno-Scottish mission
Eigg

Notes

References

Cogan, Anthony. The Diocese Of Meath. (Vol.1). Dublin:, 1862.
Farmer, David Hugh. The Oxford Dictionary of Saints. Oxford: Oxford University Press, 1992. 
Smyth, Alfred P. Warlords and Holy Men, Scotland AD 80-1000. : Edward Arnold, 1984. 

617 deaths
7th-century Christian martyrs
7th-century Irish priests
Eigg
History of Catholicism in Scotland
Irish expatriates in Scotland
Irish people murdered abroad
Medieval Irish saints
Medieval Scottish saints
Colombanian saints
Executed Irish people
Year of birth unknown